Glipa tricolor is a species of beetle in the genus Glipa. It was described in 1823.

References

tricolor
Beetles described in 1823